Gihon is the name of the second river mentioned in the second chapter of the biblical Book of Genesis. The Gihon is mentioned as one of four rivers (along with the Tigris, Euphrates, and Pishon) issuing out of the Garden of Eden that branched from a single river within the garden.

Overview
The name (Hebrew Gīḥōn גיחון) may be interpreted as "bursting forth, gushing".

The author of Genesis describes Gihon as "encircling the entire land of Cush", a name associated with Ethiopia elsewhere in the Bible. This is the reason that Ethiopians have long identified the Gihon (Giyon) with the Abay River (Blue Nile), which encircles the former kingdom of Gojjam. From a geographic standpoint this would seem impossible, since two of the other rivers said to issue out of Eden, the Tigris and the Euphrates, are in Mesopotamia. However, the scholar Edward Ullendorff has argued in support of this identification.

Some scholars identify Cush in this context as the ancient Kassite kingdom, which encompassed a Mesopotamian area that is repeatedly flooded by the Tigris and Euphrates rivers. This view has some support from Herodotus, who thought there were both an African Ethiopia (Cush) and a northern (Asiatic) Ethiopia.

Nineteenth century, modern, and Arabic scholars have sought to identify the "land of Cush" with Hindu Kush, and Gihon with Amu Darya (Jihon/Jayhon of the Islamic texts). Amu Darya was known in the medieval Islamic writers as Jayhun or Ceyhun in Turkish. This was a derivative of Jihon, or Zhihon as it is still known by the Persians.

First-century Jewish historian Josephus associated the Gihon river with the Nile.

Gihon has also been associated with the Araxes (modern Aras) river which flows through Turkey, Armenia, Azerbaijan, and Iran.

Juris Zarins identified the Gihon with the Karun River in Iran and Kush with the land of the Kassites.

The Sefer haYashar, a medieval Hebrew midrash, asserts that in the time of Enos, grandson of Adam, the river Gihon was subject to a catastrophic flood due to the wickedness of man.

See also
 Jaihan
 al-Qurnah
 Pishon

References

Torah places
Mythological rivers
Bereshit (parashah)
Hebrew Bible rivers
Book of Genesis
Nile
Blue Nile